Subin may refer to:
Subin (Ghana parliament constituency)
Šubin, village in the municipality of Srebrenica, Bosnia and Herzegovina
Su-bin, Korean unisex given name
 Subin (singer), member of the South Korean girl group Dal Shabet

See also
Shubin